Kasper Beier Køhlert (born 25 July 2020) is a Danish footballer who currently plays for Varde IF.

Køhlert began his career with local side Esbjerg, he spent his youth years there before joining Varde IF. In the summer of 2013 Køhlert went to ONS Sneek, where he still plays.

Køhlert's father is Morten Køhlert who currently works as an assistant manager at Varde If and his brother Nicolaj Køhlert who is younger, have played for Liverpool, Glasgow Rangers and is now playing for the Danish side Silkeborg IF.

References

Information about Kasper Køhlert
Kasper Køhlert on vifelite.dk

1989 births
Living people
Danish men's footballers
Danish expatriates in the Netherlands
Association football midfielders
ONS Sneek players